Midland is a rapid transit station on Line 3 Scarborough of the Toronto subway in Toronto, Ontario, Canada. It is located on Midland Avenue between Ellesmere Road and Progress Avenue.

In February 2021, the TTC recommended the closure of Line 3 in 2023 and its replacement by bus service until the completion of the Scarborough extension of Line 2 Bloor–Danforth. This closure would also include this station.

History
Midland station opened in 1985, along with the rest of the Scarborough line.

Station description

The station is located beside and above Midland Avenue, between Ellesmere Road and Progress Avenue. The station is also fairly small compared to the other stations on the Scarborough RT line. It is built on two levels, with the two entrances on either side of Midland Avenue, as well as the collector and bus stops on ground level, and the Scarborough RT platforms on the level above.

The east side entrance to the station is an unstaffed automatic entrance with entry only by Presto card.

Rapid transit infrastructure in the vicinity
East of the station, the RT continues to run elevated above the ground, and the elevation of the bridge increases as the tracks go further east towards Scarborough Centre station. West of the station, the tracks gradually descend until reaching a tunnel where it makes a 90 degree turn south and it reaches Ellesmere station as soon as it exits the tunnel.

Nearby landmarks
Nearby the station is the Atlantic Packaging, former Scarborough Public Library Administrative offices, former Scarborough Animal Shelter and former Bick's Pickle plant.

Surface connections

A transfer is required to connect between the subway system and these surface routes:

TTC routes serving the station include:

References

External links
 
 

Line 3 Scarborough stations
Railway stations in Canada opened in 1985